Will Meyrick, born in Portimao, Portugal on 17 September 1976, is a Scottish celebrity chef based in Bali, Indonesia. He has siblings born in Beirut, lived in Italy and Peru, and moved to Scotland by the age of 16 He's married, with 3 children.

References

External links
 

Living people
Scottish chefs
1976 births